Black Scorpion may refer to:
Scorpion, an animal of the order Scorpiones within the class Arachnida

Films and TV 
The Black Scorpion (film), a 1957 film about giant scorpions, with special effects by Willis O'Brien
Black Scorpion (film), a 1995 film produced by Roger Corman and starring Joan Severance
Black Scorpion II: Aftershock, a 1997 sequel to Black Scorpion that also starred Joan Severance
Black Scorpion (TV series), a 2001 TV series based on the Black Scorpion movies, starring Michelle Lintel

Video games 
Black Scorpion, an armored supervillain from the video game City of Heroes

People 
Benjamin Adekunle (1936–2014), Nigerian Army officer nicknamed Black scorpion
Black Scorpion (performer) (born 1979), freak show/sideshow performer from Austin, TX

Sport 
The Black Scorpion (professional wrestling), a professional wrestling gimmick